Fudge doughnuts are a delicacy in parts of Scotland and  England. They are made in chocolate and caramel frosted varieties and have a confectionery custard filling.

Fudge doughnuts are a favourite among students of the University of St Andrews, and warranted a mention in the Installation Address of the Principal and Vice-Chancellor Professor Sally Mapstone in 2016.

See also
 List of doughnut varieties
 List of breakfast foods
 List of pastries

References

External links

Scottish desserts